Matti Ensio Nykänen (17 July 1963 – 4 February 2019) was a Finnish ski jumper who competed from 1981 to 1991. He is one of the most successful ski jumpers of all time, having won five Winter Olympic medals (four gold), nine World Championship medals (five gold), and 22 Finnish Championship medals (14 gold). Most notably, he won three gold medals at the 1988 Winter Olympics, becoming, along with Yvonne van Gennip of the Netherlands, the most medaled athlete that winter.

Nykänen is the only ski jumper in history to have won all five of the sport's major events: a gold medal at the Winter Olympics (three times), the Ski Jumping World Championships (once), the Ski Flying World Championships (once), four World Cup overall titles, and the Four Hills Tournament (twice). His four World Cup titles is an all-time male record shared with Adam Małysz. Nykänen remains the only male five-time ski flying world record holder in history.

From the 1990s onwards, Nykänen's status as a celebrity was mainly fueled by his personal relationships, his career as a pop singer, and various incidents often related to heavy use of alcohol and violent behaviour. He was sentenced to 26 months in prison following a stabbing incident in 2004, and again for 16 months following an aggravated assault on his wife in 2009.

Ski jumping career

For most of the 1980s, Nykänen and Jens Weißflog of East Germany dominated the sport. Nykänen won gold and silver at the 1984 Winter Olympics in Sarajevo. His 17.5-point gold medal victory was the largest margin of victory in Olympic ski jumping history at the time. He was also the first ever to win gold medals on both hills at the 1988 Winter Olympics in Calgary. 

In 1985 he flew 191 metres in Planica, a world record that stood briefly until Piotr Fijas (Poland) flew 194 metres, again in Planica, in 1987. His other achievements include a total of nine medals (five golds) at the World Championship level. He also won a total of 46 World Cup competitions (only now topped by the current record-holder Gregor Schlierenzauer, Austria) and won the overall title four times (also a record, currently shared with Adam Małysz Poland). 

He won the prestigious Four Hills Tournament twice. He competed in the FIS Ski Flying World Championships five times and placed in the medals every time. Nykänen also won the ski jumping competition at the Holmenkollen ski festival twice (1982, 1985). In 1987, Nykänen was awarded the Holmenkollen Medal (shared with Hermann Weinbuch).

On 28 February 2008, he won the International Masters Championship for veteran ski jumpers.

The only one with five world records

On 16 March 1984, he set ski jumping world distance record on official training two times at 182 metres (597 ft). And on the next day at 185 metres (607 ft), all three in Oberstdorf, West Germany.

On 15 March 1985, he set two ski jumping world distance records on official training at 187 metres (614 ft) and at 191 metres (627 ft), both of them on Velikanka bratov Gorišek in Planica, Yugoslavia.

Olympic games

Standings

World Cup

Standings

Wins

Ski jumping world records
He set five world records in total, the most of any ski jumper in history.

Personal life

Nykänen was married six times:
 Tiina Hassinen (1986–1988), one son
 Pia Hynninen (1989–1991), one daughter
 Sari Paanala (1996–1998) (Nykänen changed his surname to Paanala during this marriage)
 Mervi Tapola (2001–2003, remarried 2004–2010)
 Pia Talonpoika (2014– his death)

Relationship with Mervi Tapola
Nykänen met millionaire “sausage heiress” Mervi Tapola (1954–2019) in 1999, and they were married from 2001 to 2003.
They got divorced in 2003, and remarried again in 2004. The marriage was tempestuous and gave rise to many well-publicised incidents: The first reported assault against Tapola occurred in June 2000, following a restraining order that was imposed upon Nykänen. In 2004, Nykänen was handed a suspended sentence for assaulting Tapola again. Nykänen had already been accused of assaulting Tapola in 2001, but the charges were withdrawn because Tapola exercised her right to remain silent.

In September 2005, while on probation for another assault, Nykänen was re-arrested four days after his release for abusing his partner again. Nykänen was convicted and imprisoned for four months on 16 March 2006. Soon after his release, he stabbed a man in a pizza restaurant in Korpilahti. In the summer of 2009, Tapola (then Tapola-Nykänen) petitioned for divorce a 14th time, but cancelled it.

On Christmas Day 2009, Nykänen allegedly injured his wife with a knife and tried to throttle her with a bathrobe belt. He was charged for attempted manslaughter and held in custody by Tampere police, but was released on 28 December after charges were dropped for insufficient evidence. On 24 August 2010, Nykänen was convicted of grievous bodily harm and sentenced to 16 months in prison and ordered to pay €5,000 in compensation to his wife for pain and emotional suffering and €3,000 for legal expenses. In August 2010, Tapola made a 15th request for divorce.

Assault incident
On 24 August 2004, Nykänen was arrested on suspicion of attempted manslaughter of a family friend after losing a finger pulling competition in Tottijärvi, Nokia. In October 2004, he was found guilty of aggravated assault, and sentenced to 26 months in prison. As it was a first offence, he was released in September 2005.

As an entertainer
When Nykänen's ski jumping career was drawing to a close, a group of businessmen proposed to make him a singer. His first album Yllätysten yö (Night of surprises) was released in 1992 and sold over 25,000 copies. Nykänen became the second Olympic gold medalist after Tapio Rautavaara to be awarded a golden record in Finland. His next album Samurai (1993) was not as successful.

At the end of the 1990s, due to serious financial problems, Nykänen worked as a stripper in a Järvenpää restaurant. The restaurateur was reproached for exploitation of Nykänen.

In 2002, Nykänen made a comeback as a singer and released the single "Ehkä otin, ehkä en" ("Maybe I took [it], maybe I didn't"). He also gave his name to a cider brand with the same advertisement slogan. In 2006 Nykänen released his third studio album Ehkä otin, ehkä en (Maybe I took it, maybe I didn't).  During most of his musical career, Nykänen worked with professional musician Jussi Niemi. Nykänen toured Finland performing two to three times a week with the Samurai ensemble led by Niemi.

Many of Nykänen's singles were named after some (in)famous quotes by Nykänen, such as Elämä on laiffii ("Life is life"), Jokainen tsäänssi on mahdollisuus ("Every chance is a possibility"), and Ehkä otin, ehkä en.

In November 2009, Nykänen began to present his own cooking web series Mattihan se sopan keitti (After all, it's a soup kitchen).

ADHD diagnosis
In the early 2000s, Nykänen was diagnosed with attention deficit hyperactivity disorder.

Death 
Matti Nykänen died at his home in Lappeenranta, shortly after midnight on 4 February 2019, from a sudden illness, at the age of 55. He had complained of dizziness and nausea earlier that night. He had been diagnosed with diabetes less than three months earlier. The news of his death was widely reported by the media both in Finland and abroad, with many tributes also paid to him by fellow ski jumpers of his time. He was survived by his fifth wife and three children, two from previous relationships and one outside of marriage. In May 2019 Nykänen's sisters confirmed that the cause of death was pancreatitis and pneumonia.

In popular culture
In 1988 DPR Korea issued a postage stamp depicting Nykänen in the flight during competition.
In 2016, Swedish actor Edvin Endre portrayed Nykänen, in the British biographical sports film Eddie the Eagle.

Discography
Yllätysten yö (1992)
Samurai (1993)
Ehkä otin, ehkä en (2006)

Biographies

A film about the life of Nykänen, simply entitled Matti, was released in 2006 with Finnish actor Jasper Pääkkönen cast as Nykänen. The movie focused on Nykänen's exploits beyond ski jumping.

Books
Matti Nykänen, Päivi Ainasoja and Manu Syrjänen: Mattihan se sopan keitti (2007)
Juha-Veli Jokinen: Missä me ollaan ja oonko mäkin siellä (2007)
Juha-Veli Jokinen: Elämä on laiffii (2006)
Kai Merilä: Matin ja minun rankka reissu (2005)
Egon Theiner: Grüsse aus der Hölle (2004) (the English version of the book Greetings from Hell was published in January 2006)
Antero Kujala: Voittohyppy (1999)
Antti Arve: Matti Nykänen Maailman paras (1988)
Kari Kyheröinen and Hannu Miettinen: Takalaudasta täysillä: Matti Nykäsen tie maailmanhuipulle (1984)
 Juha-Veli Jokinen: Myötä- ja vastamäessä (2010)

See also
Matti Pulli

References

External links

1963 births
2019 deaths
Sportspeople from Jyväskylä
Finnish erotic dancers
Finnish pop singers
Finnish male ski jumpers
Holmenkollen medalists
Holmenkollen Ski Festival winners
Olympic ski jumpers of Finland
Olympic gold medalists for Finland
Olympic silver medalists for Finland
People convicted of assault
Ski jumpers at the 1984 Winter Olympics
Ski jumpers at the 1988 Winter Olympics
Olympic medalists in ski jumping
FIS Nordic World Ski Championships medalists in ski jumping
Medalists at the 1984 Winter Olympics
Medalists at the 1988 Winter Olympics
World record setters in ski flying
People with diabetes
Deaths from pneumonia in Finland
Deaths from pancreatitis
20th-century Finnish people